Bangladesh Railway Locomotive Class 6400 (BED-26) is a class of broad-gauge diesel-electric locomotives owned by Bangladesh Railway. Total 13 locomotives have been manufactured by Banaras Locomotive Works (BLW), India, 10 in 2001 as WDM-2B and 3 in 2004 as WDM-2CA. The class name stands for broad gauge (B), Diesel-electric (E), manufactured by DLW (D), engine with 26 * 100 hp (26) and numbered as 6401 - 6413. Currently all are active in service.

Liveries 
Initially BED-26 locomotives had the deep blue-yellow and white-red liveries. But currently they all have the traditional green-yellow liveries.

Usage 
Class 6400 locomotives when introduced, were used prominently on high-end passenger trains like Padma Express, Silk City Express and Maitree Express. Now they are mostly used on freight trains as Class 6500 locomotives are used to haul most high-end passenger trains. Intercity trains like Kapotaksha Express, Titumir Express, Sagordari Express are also hauled by these locomotives.

Gallery

See also 

 Indian locomotive class WDM-2
 Indian locomotive class WDM-3A

References 

Locomotives of Bangladesh
Co-Co locomotives
Banaras Locomotive Works locomotives
Railway locomotives introduced in 2001
5 ft 6 in gauge locomotives